Almir da Silva (born 5 January 1938), known as just Almir, is a Brazilian footballer. He played in seven matches for the Brazil national football team from 1960 to 1963. He was also part of Brazil's squad for the 1963 South American Championship.

References

External links
 

1938 births
Living people
Brazil international footballers
Association football forwards
Footballers from Rio de Janeiro (city)
Brazilian footballers